Petros VI may refer to:

 Patriarch Peter VI of Alexandria (7th–8th centuries)
 Petros (VI?), Abuna of Ethiopia in 1599?–1606
 Pope Peter VI of Alexandria, ruled in 1718–1726
 Gregory Petros VI Djeranian, Armenian Catholic Patriarch of Cilicia in 1815–1841